Eurípedes Barsanulfo, (May 1, 1880 – November 1, 1918) was a Brazilian educator, pharmacist, politician and prominent spiritist medium. He is best known as the founder and first headmaster of Colégio Allan Kardec, one of the first spiritist schools in the world.

References

 Bigheto, Alessandro Cesar. Eurípedes Barsanulfo, um educador de vanguarda na Primeira República. Bragança Paulista: SP. Editora Comenius, 2007.
 Ferreira, Inácio. Subsídio para a história de Euripedes Barsanulfo. Uberaba, MG, 1962.
 Novelino, Corina. Eurípedes, o homem e a missão. Araras, IDE, 1997.
 Rizzini, Jorge. Eurípedes Barsanulfo o apóstolo da caridade. São Bernardo do Campo: SP. Editora Espírita Correio Fraterno do ABC, 1979.

1880 births
1918 deaths
Deaths from Spanish flu
Brazilian educational theorists
Brazilian educators
Popular education
Brazilian spiritual mediums
Brazilian psychics
People from Minas Gerais